Ensom is a song by Danish singer Medina from her second studio album Velkommen til Medina. It was released as the third single from the album on 2 November 2009. The song was written by Medina, Rasmus Stabell and Jeppe Federspiel and was produced by Providers. "Ensom" peaked at number two in Denmark.

Track listing
 Danish digital download
 "Ensom" (Radio Edit) – 3:25

 Danish iTunes digital download EP
 "Ensom" (Radio Edit) – 3:25
 "Ensom" (Svenstrup & Vendelboe Remix) – 4:47
 "Ensom" (Ronen Dahan Remix) – 4:15
 "Ensom" (Jay Adams Remix) – 7:03 
 "Ensom" – 4:11
 "Ensom" (Akustisk Mix) – 4:14

Charts and certifications

Charts

Certifications

Release history

References

External links
 

2009 singles
Dance-pop songs
Medina (singer) songs
Songs written by Rasmus Stabell
Songs written by Jeppe Federspiel
2009 songs
Songs written by Medina (singer)